Alizée Poulicek (born 26 June 1987) is a Belgian-Czech model, TV presenter and former beauty pageant titleholder.

Biography 
Poulicek won the title of Miss Belgium 2008 and represented her country in Miss Universe 2008 in Nha Trang, Vietnam. She also represented Belgium in Miss World 2008 in Johannesburg, South Africa.

She can speak French, English, and Czech. At the time of her reign as Miss Belgium she could not speak Dutch (although she did receive Dutch lessons in school, according to Poulicek "of ridiculous low quality"); which led to controversy in Flanders.

Following her reign, Poulicek followed a career in modelling and television presenting, including for the RSCA sports station.

References

External links

1987 births
Living people
People from Uccle
Belgian people of Czech descent
Belgian female models
Miss World 2008 delegates
Miss Universe 2008 contestants
Walloon people
Belgian beauty pageant winners
Beauty pageant controversies
Controversies in Belgium
Miss Belgium winners